In mathematics, inverse mapping theorem may refer to:

 the inverse function theorem on the existence of local inverses for functions with non-singular derivatives
 the bounded inverse theorem on the boundedness of the inverse for invertible bounded linear operators on Banach spaces